Cheshmeh Dargah (also Romanized as Cheshmeh Dargāh, Cheshmeh-ye Dargāh, Chashmeh Dargāh, and Cheshyeh Dargāh) is a village in Japelaq-e Gharbi Rural District, Japelaq District, Azna County, Lorestan Province, Iran. At the 2006 census, its population was 97, in 20 families.

References 

Towns and villages in Azna County